Alexander Brown (born Kenneth Nikolaisen in 1982) is a Danish DJ. He began his career at age 15 and has received four successive nominations for Best Danish DJ. He was part of the Ministry of Sound Tour.

In 2009, Brown formed a collaboration with record producer and DJ Morten Hampenberg, going on to release joint singles as Morten Hampenberg & Alexander Brown. Some of their recordings feature collaborations with other artists, including Yepha, Stine Bramsen, Casper Christensen, and Nabiha. They gained international fame with "Raise the Roof" featuring Fatman Scoop, Pitbull and Nabiha.

Discography

EPs

Singles

See also
Morten Hampenberg & Alexander Brown

References

Danish DJs
Danish record producers
1982 births
Living people